"Make Up" is a song by American DJ Vice and American singer Jason Derulo, featuring vocals from American singer Ava Max. It was released as a single on October 23, 2018, by Atlantic Records.

Critical reception
Mike Wass from Idolator described the song as "a funk-heavy banger about the joys of making up", while BroadwayWorld stated that it "fuses Derulo's silky falsetto with Max's irresistible vocals for the ultimate 'kiss-and-make-up' anthem". Paper felt that the song encapsulated "the signature mix of sultry and upbeat pop funk we've come to love and expect from Derulo since his "Whatcha Say" days."

Music video
The music video was released on October 23, 2018. It depicts Derulo showing off his choreography and shirtless poses, alongside Max lounging at poolside. As of April 2022, the video has over 7 million views on YouTube.

Track listing

Charts

Release history

References

2018 songs
2018 singles
Jason Derulo songs
Ava Max songs